Albert Loren Rhoton Jr., (November 18, 1932 – February 21, 2016) was an American neurosurgeon and a professor specializing in microsurgical neuroanatomy. He developed and introduced a number of microsurgical techniques that improved the safety and effectiveness of neurosurgery, including the use of the surgical microscope in neurosurgery. He also designed many of the commonly used of microneurosurgical instruments, which bear his name.  Such tools in use worldwide include the Rhoton Micro Dissectors designed for delicate work in the treatment of brain aneurysms and tumor resection.

A pioneer in the field of neuroanatomy, Rhoton was a leader in vastly expanding knowledge of the anatomy of the human brain. His microscopic studies using the surgical microscope mapped the brain's intricate blood vessel network and revealed previously unknown connections between vital centers of the brain. At the University of Florida, he built the world's largest collection of three-dimensional images of the brain and published the world's best selling neurosurgical textbook, Cranial Anatomy and Surgical Approaches, both of which serve as guides for neurosurgeons across the globe. He is internationally recognized as the "father of microscopic neurosurgery" for his neuroanatomical studies which provided the anatomic basis for the development of modern neurosurgical techniques and revolutionized surgical approaches to many neurological disorders including those for acoustic neuromas and skull base tumors.

Early life and education
Rhoton was born on November 18, 1932, in Parvin, Kentucky. He grew up in a log cabin without plumbing or electricity in rural eastern Kentucky. His family moved to Akron, Ohio during the Second World War where his father was a rubber chemist.  He graduated from the Washington University School of Medicine in St. Louis in 1959 and then completed two years of training at Columbia-Presbyterian Medical Center in New York City, one year in general surgery and the other in neurological surgery. He returned to Washington University and completed his neurosurgery residency at Barnes Hospital under Dr. Henry Schwartz in 1964. He remained at Washington University for a one-year National Institutes of Health research fellowship in neuroanatomy during which time he began to use the surgical microscope in his research work and realized its potential to revolutionize surgery and also take brain anatomy to a greater level of detail.

Medical and academic career
Rhoton began as a staff neurosurgeon at the Mayo Clinic in Rochester, Minnesota, in 1966. He joined the University of Florida in 1972 as a Professor of Surgery and the Chairman of the Department of Neurological Surgery. He became the R.D. Keene Family Professor of Neurosurgery in 1981. In 2014 Rhoton was the director of the Neuro-Microanatomy Lab at the McKnight Brain Institute. Rhoton died in Gainesville, Florida, on February 21, 2016, at the age of 83.

Professional activities
Rhoton served as the President of the American Association of Neurological Surgeons, the Congress of Neurological Surgeons, the Society of Neurological Surgeons, the North American Skull Base Society, the International Interdisciplinary Congress on Craniofacial and Skull Base Surgery, the Florida Neurosurgical Society, and the International Society for Neurosurgical Technology and Instrument Invention. He served as the honored guest or was elected to honorary membership in more than 20 neurosurgical societies throughout Africa, Asia, Australia, Europe, and North and South America.

Awards
 1981, Distinguished Faculty Award, University of Florida
 1984, Alumni Achievement Award, Washington University School of Medicine
 1993, Honored Guest, Congress of Neurological Surgeons
 1997, Jamieson Medal and Lecturer, Neurosurgical Society of Australasia
 1998, Harvey Cushing Medal, American Association of Neurological Surgeons
 2000, Herbert Olivecrona Award, Karolinska Institutet, the "Nobel Prize of Neurosurgery"
 2001, Medal of Honor, World Federation of Neurosurgical Societies
 2001, Medal of Honor, Neurosurgical Society of America
 2002, Lifetime Achievement Award, University of Florida
 2006, Founder's Laurel, Congress of Neurological Surgeons
 2009, Golden Neuron Award, World Academy of Neurological Surgery

References

External links
https://web.archive.org/web/20120421182819/http://www.neurosurgery.ufl.edu/faculty-staff/albert-rhoton.shtml
http://www.facingfacialpain.org/index.php?option=com_content&view=article&id=60&Itemid=66

1932 births
2016 deaths
American neurosurgeons
Washington University School of Medicine alumni